Ronald Rindestu (5 June 1942 – 16 February 2012) was a Norwegian politician for the Centre Party.

He was elected to Troms county council in 1987, and was re-elected in 1991 and 1995. He then became mayor (fylkesordfører) of Troms, which he remained until 2007. He died in 2011.

References

1942 births
2012 deaths
Centre Party (Norway) politicians
Chairmen of County Councils of Norway
Troms politicians